Glenn Jamon Dorsey (born August 1, 1985) is a former American football nose tackle. He played college football for Louisiana State University (LSU), received All-America honors twice, and was recognized as the top college defensive player of the 2007 season. He was drafted by the Kansas City Chiefs with the fifth overall pick in the 2008 NFL draft, and has played for the San Francisco 49ers later in his career as well.

Early years
Dorsey was born in Gonzales, Louisiana.  He attended East Ascension High School in Gonzales, where he was rated among the nation's top defensive linemen and one of the top three prospects in the state. He was named Louisiana’s 4A Defensive Player of the Year and a first-team 4A all-state selection. During his junior year, Dorsey had more than 100 tackles, and 12 sacks. As a senior, he missed three games due to an ankle injury, and finished the season with 43 tackles, two sacks and one forced fumble.

Considered a four-star recruit by Rivals.com, Dorsey was listed as the No. 5 defensive tackle prospect in the nation in 2004. Dorsey committed to Louisiana State on the eve of his junior season.

College career

Dorsey attended Louisiana State University, and played for coach Nick Saban and coach Les Miles's LSU Tigers football teams from 2004 to 2007. As a true freshman in the 2004 season, he started in 3 out of 12 games. On his first collegiate snap he recovered a fumble against Oregon State. He finished the year with 18 tackles.

In 2005, he started in 1 out of 13 games. He was among LSU's 4-player rotation at defensive tackle which included Claude Wroten and Kyle Williams. He finished the season with 28 tackles and 3 sacks.

In 2006, Dorsey was named to the 2006 All-American team and was All-SEC. He finished the season as the Tigers' third-leading tackler with 64 stops, including 8.5 for losses and three sacks. Dorsey was named the SEC Defensive Lineman of the Week twice during the season.

In 2007, Dorsey started 13 of 14 games recording 69 tackles, 7 sacks, 12.5 tackles for loss, three passes defensed, and a forced fumble. He was also named the SEC Defensive Player of the Week twice during the season.  Following the 2007 season, he was recognized as a unanimous first-team All-American.  He also finished ninth in the 2007 voting for the Heisman Trophy, receiving more votes than any other defensive player in the nation. In addition, Dorsey was awarded the Bronko Nagurski Trophy, the Outland Trophy, the Lott Trophy and the Lombardi Award, becoming the only player to win all four awards.  Dorsey was a member of LSU's 2007 BCS Championship team. He was a key component in LSU’s drive to the BCS national title despite playing the second half of the season with knee and tailbone injuries.

Awards and honors
 2× First-team All-SEC (2006, 2007)
 2× First-team All-American (2006, 2007)
 SEC Defensive Player of the Year (2007)
 Lombardi Award (2007)
 Outland Trophy (2007)
 Bronko Nagurski Trophy (2007)
 Lott Trophy (2007)
 College Football Hall of Fame inductee (2020)

Career statistics

Professional career
Prior to the draft some NFL teams expressed concern over a lingering stress fracture Dorsey sustained in 2006. At the NFL Combine, Dorsey spent nearly ten hours getting examined at an Indianapolis hospital.

Kansas City Chiefs
Dorsey was drafted by the Kansas City Chiefs fifth overall in the 2008 NFL Draft. On July 26, 2008, he signed a five-year, $51 million contract with $23 million guaranteed.

On November 8, he recorded his first career sack against San Diego Chargers quarterback Philip Rivers. He finished his rookie season with 46 tackles and one sack.

When the Chiefs shifted to a 3-4 defense under new head coach Todd Haley, Dorsey switched positions to accommodate the scheme change, and he played defensive end. Dorsey started 14 of 15 games during the 2009 season and had 54 tackles and one sack. In 2010, he started all 16 games and had 69 tackles and two sacks. In 2011, Dorsey had 62 tackles, but no sacks.

San Francisco 49ers
On March 13, 2013, Dorsey signed a two-year deal with the San Francisco 49ers. Dorsey was expected to be a reserve, but following the injury to starting nose tackle Ian Williams in week two, Dorsey took over the starting job. Dorsey signed a two-year extension with San Francisco on August 19, 2014. On November 25, 2015, Dorsey was placed on injured reserve with a torn ACL, ending his career.

NFL career statistics

Activism
He promoted animal  for PETA.

References

External links

 Kansas City Chiefs bio
 LSU Tigers bio

1985 births
Living people
African-American players of American football
All-American college football players
American football defensive ends
American football defensive tackles
College Football Hall of Fame inductees
Kansas City Chiefs players
LSU Tigers football players
Players of American football from Louisiana
San Francisco 49ers players
People from Gonzales, Louisiana
21st-century African-American sportspeople
20th-century African-American people
Ed Block Courage Award recipients